The Ragusano is a breed of donkey from the Mediterranean island of Sicily. It is associated particularly with the comuni of Modica, Ragusa, Santa Croce Camerina and Scicli, all in the Province of Ragusa in southern Sicily. It is one of the eight autochthonous donkey breeds of limited distribution recognised by the Ministero delle Politiche Agricole Alimentari e Forestali, the Italian ministry of agriculture and forestry. The Ragusano was listed as "endangered" by the FAO in 2007.

Uses 
The milk of the Ragusano donkey has demonstrated remarkable antiviral properties and some scientists believe it could be useful in preventing viral human gastrointestinal infections.

References

Donkey breeds originating in Italy
Donkey breeds
Sicily
Ark of Taste foods